Mirta González Suárez (born September 29, 1948) is a Costa Rican social psychologist and novelist. She is an emeritus professor of psychology at the University of Costa Rica, where she has conducted research in women's studies and political psychology. In 2016 she won the award "UNA palabra" by the National University of Costa Rica for her novel "La gobernadora" and in 2021 the "Juegos Florales Hispanoamericanos de Quetzaltenango 2021" for the novel "La Independencia".

Early life and education 
González Suárez was born in San José, Costa Rica, in 1948. She earned her PhD in psychology from the Autonomous University of Madrid in 1987, with a dissertation on sexism in Costa Rican education. While pursuing her doctoral studies, she earned a Fulbright Award, which she used to compare sexism in American and Costa Rican texts.

Academia 
González Suárez is a professor emeritus of psychology at the University of Costa Rica. Her research interests include sexism in education, discrimination, and political psychology. She has published more than 50 works in Spanish, including books and peer-reviewed articles.

González Suárez was the first director of the University of Costa Rica/National University of Costa Rica joint Women's Studies graduate program. She was the deputy director of the Centre for Research in Women's Studies at the University of Costa Rica. In 1993, she chaired the organizing committee for the Fifth International Interdisciplinary Congress on Women, held in San José. In 2008 a writing award in her name was created at the University of Costa Rica.

Writing 
González Suárez published her first novel, Crimen con sonrisa (Crime with a Smile), in 2013; it was awarded Costa Rica's Aquileo J. Echeverria National Literary Award. Her 2016 novel, La Gobernadora (The Governor), won the UNA Palabra Prize from the National University of Costa Rica.

Selected works

Academic books

Journal articles

Novels 

 
 
 La independencia (2021), Juegos Florales Hispanoamericanos de Quetzaltenango

References 

1948 births
Living people
21st-century Costa Rican writers
21st-century Costa Rican women writers
Women psychologists
Costa Rican academics
Social psychologists
Feminist psychologists
People from San José, Costa Rica
Autonomous University of Madrid alumni
Academic staff of the University of Costa Rica